I Build the Tower is a feature-length documentary film depicting the life of Sabato Rodia also known as Sam Rodia and Simon Rodia, the Italian immigrant who created the Watts Towers in South Los Angeles.

The film has been recognized by Robert Koehler in Variety as "the most complete visual account of Rodia and his masterpiece".

Production 

Completed in 2006, I Build the Tower was directed, written and produced by Edward  and Brad Byer. The project was initiated by Byer's extensive research into the life of Rodia, his great-uncle. With exclusive access to a wealth of family materials, Byer teamed up with independent filmmaker Edward  who had been working with Watts community groups for several years.

Together they started production by filming the last recorded interview with architect, designer and futurist Buckminster Fuller, three months before his death in 1983. Hailing Rodia as "one of the greatest sculptors of the twentieth century", Fuller analyzed Rodia's intuitive understanding of aesthetics and natural engineering principles.

The filmmakers went on to shoot their film throughout Los Angeles, the San Francisco Bay area and southern Italy, and managed to sustain the vitality of their work while waiting years for the Los Angeles Cultural Affairs Department to remove the scaffolding erected for the restoration of the towers.

The narrative of the documentary is drawn from audio interviews of Rodia recorded in the early 1960s. In his own words and voice, Rodia himself chronicles his redemption from alcoholism and despair to a fierce determination to build "something big". The story is filled out by recent interviews with relatives, neighbors and other witnesses who have come into close contact with the Watts Towers, including artist John Outterbridge and historian Mike Davis. Phil Proctor of the Firesign Theater gives voice to historic trial proceedings involving Rodia.

The film's musical score is based on the opera arias of Giuseppe Verdi – the music Rodia loved – and spans the time and distance from nineteenth century Italy to present-day Los Angeles. The classical score was arranged and conducted by noted silent film music composer Robert Israel. Jazz pianist Nate Morgan composed an original jazz score using Verdi's themes and performed by Morgan's ensemble. Filmmakers Byer and  conceived a hip-hop song incorporating Rodia's own voice as lead vocal, backed up by jazz vocalists Dwight Trible and Logan Johnson, Jr., set to music by Michael Abels.

In April, 2009, I Build the Tower was the opening presentation of "Art and Migration:  Sabato Rodia's Watts Towers in Los Angeles", the first international conference on the Watts Towers. The conference was held in Genoa, Italy, sponsored by the University of Genoa and the U.C.L.A. International Institute.

Reception 

I Build the Tower has been praised by documentary filmmaker Ken Burns as "wonderful, lyrical and compelling", and by film critic Leonard Maltin as "heartfelt and fascinating... a real discovery".

References 

 Christopher R. C. Bosen, "Oscar and Sam:  Documentary Portraits of Two Creative Artists", Documentary:  The Magazine of the International Documentary Association, Vol. 25, No. 7, November–December, 2006
 Robert Koehler, "Review of I Build the Tower", Variety, March 15, 2005
 Andy Rose, "Documentary:  Show Me the Money!", MovieMaker:  The Art and Business of Making Movies, Issue No. 59, Vol. 12, Summer, 2005

External links 

 
 Interview with filmmaker Edward Landler
 Los Angeles Times article
 

2006 films
2006 documentary films
Art in Greater Los Angeles
History of Los Angeles
California Historical Landmarks
Visionary environments
Documentary films about Los Angeles
Documentary films about visual artists
2000s English-language films